The 2014 Men's Wheelchair Basketball World Championship was the 12th edition of the Wheelchair Basketball World Championship. It was hosted in Incheon, South Korea. Australia won its second title in a row.

Medalists

Preliminary round

Group A

Group B

Group C

Group D

Second round

Group E

Group F

Group G

Playoffs
 Place 15/16

 Place 13/14

 Place 11/12

 Place 9/10

 Place 7/8

 Place 5/6

Finals

Quarterfinals

Semifinals

Bronze medal match

Gold medal match

Final standings

See also
 2014 Women's World Wheelchair Basketball Championship

External links
 Official site of the 2014 Incheon World Wheelchair Basketball Championship

Mens
International basketball competitions hosted by South Korea
2014 in wheelchair basketball
2014–15 in South Korean basketball